Castione della Presolana (Bergamasque:  or ) is a comune (municipality) in the Province of Bergamo in the Italian region of Lombardy, located about  northeast of Milan and about  northeast of Bergamo.

Castione della Presolana borders the following municipalities: Angolo Terme, Colere, Fino del Monte, Onore, Rogno, Rovetta, Songavazzo.

Demographic evolution

Twin towns — sister cities
Castione della Presolana is twinned with:

  Bons-en-Chablais, France  
  Adenau, Germany

Notable people
 

Giacomo Sozzi, late-19th century Italian sculptor

References